Ballyhenry may refer to:

 Ballyhenry, County Antrim, a townland in County Antrim, Northern Ireland
 Ballyhenry, Bourney, a townland in North Tipperary, Ireland